The Prespa minnow (Pelasgus prespensis) is a species of ray-finned fish in the family Cyprinidae. It is found in Lake Prespa which lies in the southern Balkans on the borders between Albania, Greece, and North Macedonia. Its natural habitat is freshwater lakes. It is threatened by habitat loss.

References

prespensis
Cyprinid fish of Europe
Fish described in 1924
Taxa named by Stanko Karaman
Taxonomy articles created by Polbot